Paschal Flynn (born 1937) is an Irish retired Gaelic footballer who played for club side St. Mary's and at inter-county level with the Dublin senior football team.

Career

Flynn first came to prominence when he joined the Dublin senior team in 1957. He took over from Paddy O'Flaherty as first-choice goalkeeper following his retirement in September 1959. Flynn won back-to-back Leinster Championship medals in 1962 and 1963, however, the highlight of his inter-county career was the 1963 All-Ireland final defeat of Galway. Flynn ended his career with a third provincial winners' medal in 1965.

Honours

Dublin
All-Ireland Senior Football Championship: 1963
Leinster Senior Football Championship: 1962, 1963, 1965

References

1937 births
Living people
St Mary's (Dublin) Gaelic footballers
Dublin inter-county Gaelic footballers